The 1878 Londonderry County by-election was fought on 18 December 1878.  The byelection was fought due to the death of the incumbent Liberal MP, Richard Smyth.  It was won by the Liberal candidate Sir Thomas McClure.

References

1878 elections in the United Kingdom
By-elections to the Parliament of the United Kingdom in County Londonderry constituencies
19th century in County Londonderry
1878 elections in Ireland